Michel Contini (Cagliari, 1937) is a Sardinian,  naturalized French linguist, researcher and academic.

Biography 
Born in Cagliari, he completed elementary school in Oristano, middle school in Cagliari, and obtained a scientific high school diploma in Sassari.

In 1958 he began living in Grenoble, France, where he graduated in Languages in 1964, and in 1965 he obtained the French citizenship.

After graduating, he began to publish his first studies about the Sardinian language, during his doctorate. The first one, published for the 3rd-cycle Doctorate, was a phonetic and phonological study of the dialect of Nughedu San Nicolò, and he later made many other ones during his three years of work (1967-1970) as a researcher at the CNRS, studying Sardinian, French and Italian.

Regarding Sardinian, his studies have come to analyze the variants of 214 Sardinian languages, and thanks to this work he obtained the State Doctorate (Strasbourg, 1983) with his thesis Etude de geographie phonetique et de phonetique instrumentale du sarde (Study of phonetic geography and instrumental phonetics of Sardinian), published in 1987 by the publisher Edizioni dell'Orso.

Later, he became full professor of Geolinguistics and Phonetics and Director of the Center for Dialectology at the Stendhal University of Grenoble, and became director of the European Project for the Romance Linguistic Atlas of the State Mint and Polygraphic Institute of Rome, a collaborative project of 85 universities and 31 researchers from all over the Romance-speaking countries.

In 2006 he was part of the commission for the creation of the Limba Sarda Comuna, together with Giulio Angioni, Roberto Bolognesi, Manlio Brigaglia, Diego Corràine, Giovanni Lupinu, Anna Oppo, Giulio Paulis, Maria Teresa Pinna Catte and Mario Puddu, and since then he has always declared himself in favor of its use, considering the use of a single orthography tas something necessary to save the language from extinction. In 2011 he started working at the ALiMuS, Multimedia Linguistic Atlas of Sardinia, a work that was stopped in 2014.

Following his retirement, he continued to work on the Atlas Linguistique Roman (ALIR) and the Atlas Linguarum Europae (ALE).

Publications 
This is a partial list of Michel Contini's publications during the years. It does not include most of them.

References 

Linguists from Italy
People from Sardinia
Linguists from France
1937 births
Living people